Wizards of the Coast LLC (often referred to as WotC  or simply Wizards) is an American publisher of games, primarily based on fantasy and science fiction themes, and formerly an operator of retail stores for games. It is currently a subsidiary of Hasbro, which acquired the company in 1999. During a February 2021 reorganization at Hasbro, Wizards of the Coast became the lead part of the new "Wizards & Digital" division.

Originally a role-playing game publisher, the company originated and popularized the collectible card game genre with Magic: The Gathering in the mid-1990s. It also acquired the popular Dungeons & Dragons role-playing game by buying  TSR and increased its success by publishing the licensed Pokémon Trading Card Game. The company's corporate headquarters are located in Renton, Washington, part of the Seattle metropolitan area.

Wizards of the Coast publishes role-playing games, board games, and collectible card games. They have received numerous awards, including several Origins Awards. The company also produced sports cards sets, releasing series for association football, baseball, basketball and American football.

History 

Wizards of the Coast (or WOTC) was founded by Peter Adkison in 1990 outside Seattle, Washington, and its current headquarters is located in nearby Renton. The company was named after a guild of wizards from a Dungeons & Dragons campaign that Adkison was playing. The company initially published only role-playing games such as the third edition of Talislanta and its own The Primal Order. The Primal Order was a supplement designed for use with any game system, but its release in 1992 brought legal trouble with Palladium Books for references to Palladium's game and system. The suit was settled in 1993.

In 1991, Richard Garfield approached Wizards of the Coast with the idea for a new board game called RoboRally, but he was turned down because WOTC felt that the game would have been too expensive to produce. Instead, Adkison asked Garfield if he could invent a game that was both portable and quick-playing, to which Garfield agreed.

Adkison set up a new corporation called Garfield Games to develop Garfield's collectible card game concept into Magic: The Gathering. The new name kept the game sheltered from the legal battle with Palladium. Garfield Games then licensed the production and sale rights to Wizards until the court case was settled, at which point the shell company was shut down. Wizards debuted Magic in July 1993 at the Origins Game Fair in Dallas. The game proved extremely popular at Gen Con in August 1993, selling out of its supply of 2.5 million cards - an amount which had been scheduled to last until the end of the year. The success of Magic generated revenue that transformed the company in two years from a handful of employees working out of Peter's basement headquarters into 250 employees in its own offices. In 1994, Magic won both the Mensa Top Five mind games award and the Origins Awards for Best Fantasy or Science Fiction Board Game of 1993 and Best Graphic Presentation of a Board Game of 1993.

In 1994, Wizards began an association with The Beanstalk Group, a brand licensing agency and consultancy, to license the Magic brand. After the success of Magic, Wizards published RoboRally in 1994 and it won the 1994 Origins Awards for Best Fantasy or Science Fiction Board Game and Best Graphic Presentation of a Board Game. Wizards also expanded its role-playing game line by buying SLA Industries from Nightfall Games and Ars Magica from White Wolf in 1994. In 1995, Wizards published another card game by Richard Garfield called The Great Dalmuti, which won the 1995 Mensa Best New Mind Game award. In August 1995, Wizards released Everway before closing its roleplaying game product line four months later. In 1995, Wizards' annual sales passed US$65 million.

Acquisition of TSR and Pokémon Trading Card Game 

Wizards announced the purchase of TSR, the makers of Dungeons & Dragons, on April 10, 1997. Wizards acquired TSR and Five Rings Publishing Group for $25 million. As part of the sale, TSR employees were offered an opportunity to relocate from Wisconsin to the west coast. Wizards continued to use the TSR brand name until 2000, then allowed the trademark to expire in 2004. Between 1997 and 1999, the company spun off several TSR campaign settings, including Planescape, Dark Sun, and Spelljammer to focus the business on what the company deemed to be the more profitable Greyhawk and Forgotten Realms lines.

In summer 1997, Wizards revisited the concept of a 3rd edition of Dungeons & Dragons, having first discussed it soon after the purchase of TSR. Wizards released the third edition of Dungeons & Dragons in 2000 alongside the d20 System. With these releases came the Open Game License which allowed other companies to make use of those systems.

The new edition of the D&D game won multiple Origins Awards in 2000, such as Best Roleplaying Game for Dungeons & Dragons and Best Graphic Presentation of a Roleplaying Game, Adventure, or Supplement for the Monster Manual. In 2002, Wizards sponsored a design contest which allowed designers to submit proposals to the company to produce a new campaign world. Wizards selected "Eberron", submitted by Keith Baker, and its first campaign book was released in June 2004. The Eberron Campaign Setting won the 2004 Origins Award for Best Role-Playing Supplement. In 2003, Wizards released version 3.5 of Dungeons & Dragons and the d20 system. The 30th anniversary of the D&D game was celebrated at Gen Con Indy 2004.

Pokémon TCG 
On August 2, 1997, Wizards of the Coast was granted  on collectible card games. In January 1999, Wizards of the Coast began publishing the Pokémon Trading Card Game after acquiring the rights in August 1998. The game sold nearly 400,000 copies in less than six weeks and sold 10 times better than Wizards's initial projections. Some sports card series were discontinued in 1999 because so many printers were producing Pokémon cards. The game won the 1999 National Parenting Center's Seal of Approval.

Within a year, Wizards had sold millions of copies of the Pokémon game and the company released a new set that included an instructional CD-ROM. Wizards continued to publish the game until 2003. One of Nintendo's affiliates, The Pokémon Company (formerly Pokémon USA), began producing a new edition for the game one day after the last of its agreements with Wizards expired September 30, and Wizards filed suit against Nintendo the following day, October 1, 2003, accusing them of "abandoning a contract with Wizards, the longtime producer and distributor of Pokémon trading-card games, and using Wizards-patented methods and technology to manufacture the games itself." The two companies resolved their differences in December 2003 without going to court.

Retail stores 
After the company's success in 1999 with Pokémon, Wizards of the Coast acquired and expanded The Game Keeper, a US chain of retail gaming stores, eventually changing its name to Wizards of the Coast. The company's gaming center in Seattle was closed in March 2001. In December 2003, Wizards announced that it would close all of its stores in order to concentrate on game design. The stores were closed in the spring of 2004.

Acquisition by Hasbro 
In September 1999, Hasbro bought Wizards of the Coast for about US$325 million. Avalon Hill was made a division of Wizards of the Coast, in late 1999; the company had been purchased by Hasbro in the summer of 1998. In November 1999, Wizards announced that Gen Con would leave Milwaukee after the 2002 convention. Also in November, Vince Caluori became President of Wizards of the Coast.

On January 1, 2001, Peter Adkison resigned from Wizards. In August 2001, the company went from a semi-independent division of Hasbro to being consolidated into Hasbro's game division. ICv2, an industry trade magazine, reported that "this is seen as a loss of autonomy for WotC by most. The Hasbro release specified that despite the consolidation at the management level, WotC will continue to operate out of its Seattle offices". Between 2001 and 2002, Hasbro sold Origins to GAMA, and in May 2002 sold Gen Con to Peter Adkison. Around this time, Wizards outsourced its magazines by licensing Dungeon, Dragon, Polyhedron, and Amazing Stories to Paizo Publishing.

2000–2010 
In 2000, Wizards of the Coast introduced the Open Game License (OGL) which allowed a wide range of unofficial commercial derivative work based on the mechanics of Dungeons and Dragons to be produced; it is credited with increasing the market share of d20 products and leading to a "boom in the RPG industry in the early 2000s". Chuck Huebner became president and CEO of Wizards of the Coast in June 2002. In 2003, the company employed 850 people. Throughout the early 2000s, Wizards won multiple Origins Awards, including: 2001 Best Role-Playing Game Supplement (Forgotten Realms Campaign Setting) and the Best Game Related Novel (Clan War 7th Scroll: The Lion); 2002 Best Role-Playing Adventure (City of the Spider Queen); 2005 Collectible Card Game or Expansion of the Year (Ravnica: City of Guilds expansion for Magic: The Gathering) and Gamer's Choice Best Historical Game of the Year (Axis and Allies Collectible Miniatures Game), and the 2006 Miniature or Miniatures Line of the Year (Colossal Red Dragon). It also won the 2002 Gold Ennie Award for "Best Publisher" and the 2006 Silver Ennie Award for "Fan's Choice for Best Publisher".

In 2002, Wizards of the Coast's periodicals department was spun off and Paizo Publishing got the license to produce Dragon and Dungeon magazines. The license expired in September 2007 and Wizards began publishing the magazines online. In 2003, Wizards released the Dungeons & Dragons miniatures collectible pre-painted plastic miniatures games. In 2004, the company added a licensed Star Wars line. In April 2004, Loren Greenwood succeeded Huebner in his positions. Also in 2004, Avalon Hill became a subsidiary of Hasbro's Wizards of the Coast division.

In early 2006, Wizards of the Coast filed a lawsuit against Daron Rutter, who was then administrator of the MTG Salvation website. The charges stemmed from Rutter publicly posting confidential prototypes for upcoming Magic: The Gathering card sets to the MTG Salvation forums, ten months before the cards were to be released. The lawsuit was settled out of court, according to Mark Rosewater.

Greg Leeds succeeded Greenwood as president and CEO of Wizards of the Coast in March 2008. Then on June 6, 2008, Wizards released the 4th Edition of Dungeons & Dragons. Wizards began introducing 4th Edition online content in Dragon and Dungeon magazines. The 4th Edition was designed to offer more streamlined game play, while the new rules framework intended to reduce the preparation time needed to run a game and make the game more accessible to new players.

Throughout the 2000s, Wizards released new editions of Magic: The Gathering (Seventh Edition in 2001, Eighth Edition in 2003, Ninth Edition in 2005, and Tenth Edition in 2007). In 2009, Wizards announced a new edition called Magic 2010, which coincided with the first major rules change to Magic since the Revised Edition was released in 1994. According to Aaron Forsythe, the new set was intended to make the game easier for players of all levels to play. Magic 2010 was the first core set since Beta to feature new cards and it was the first core set with planeswalkers.

By 2008, the company employed over 300 people and went through a restructuring. On April 6, 2009, Wizards of the Coast suspended all sales of its products for the Dungeons & Dragons games in PDF format from places such as OneBookShelf and its online storefronts RPGNow and DriveThruRPG. This coincided with a lawsuit brought against eight people in an attempt to prevent future copyright infringement of their books, and included the 4th edition Dungeons & Dragons products that were made available through these places, as well as all older editions PDFs of the game.

2010–2020 

In 2012, Ethan Gilsdorf, for the New York Times, reported that Dungeons & Dragons sales had slumped. Despite the company not releasing sales figures, analysts and gaming experts noted that sales had been declining. That year, Wizards announced a public playtest to develop a new edition of Dungeons & Dragons called D&D Next. The 5th edition of Dungeons & Dragons was released on July 15, 2014, with the Dungeons & Dragons Starter Set featuring a set of pre-generated characters, a set of instructions for basic play, and an adventure module Lost Mine of Phandelver. In 2014, 126,870 units of the Dungeons & Dragons Starter Set were sold. In 2018, 306,670 units of the Dungeons & Dragons Starter Set were sold.

Throughout the 2010s, Wizards and its products continued to earn awards. This included multiple 2015 Origins Awards, such as: Role-Playing Game Fan Favorite (Dungeon & Dragons: Players Handbook), Role-Playing Supplement Fan Favorite (Dungeon & Dragons: Monster Manual), and Collectible Card Game (Magic the Gathering: Khans of Tarkir). Wizards won the 2015 Gold Ennie Award for "Fan's Choice for Best Publisher" and won the 2017 Gold Ennie Award for "Fan's Choice for Best Publisher".

In 2014, 20th Century Fox acquired the screen rights to Magic the Gathering to turn the property into a movie series with Simon Kinberg attached to the project. Wizards filed a lawsuit against Cryptozoic Entertainment and Hex Entertainment in 2014 alleging that their online card game Hex: Shards of Fate was a Magic the Gathering clone. All three companies agreed to a settlement the following year. In 2015, it was reported that an estimated 20 million people played Magic the Gathering around the world and that the game had tournaments, a professional league and a weekly organized game program called Friday Night Magic.

Since the release of 5th edition, there have been over twenty Dungeon & Dragons books published including new rulebooks, campaign guides and adventure modules. According to The Seattle Times, 2017 had "the most number of players in its history". In Bloomberg, Mary Pilon reported that sales of 5th edition Dungeon & Dragons "were up 41 percent in 2017 from the year before, and soared another 52 percent in 2018." Also, "In 2017, 9 million people watched others play D&D on Twitch."

In 2016, Wizards of the Coast partnered with OneBookShelf to create an online community content program called Dungeon Masters Guild (DMsGuild) that allowed creators to make and sell content using Wizards of the Coast properties. In addition to being able to purchase community content, older editions of Dungeon & Dragons are available to be purchased on DMsGuild as PDFs or as print on demand books.

In 2016, Chris Cocks was announced as a replacement for Greg Leeds. Giaco Furino, for Vice, wrote of high tensions at the company over deadlines. In 2019, Wizards of the Coast became a member of the Entertainment Software Association.

In April 2019, Wizards of the Coast announced gaming industry veteran, James Ohlen, as the head of its new studio based in Austin, Texas; in January 2020 the new studio was revealed to be Archetype Entertainment. In June 2019, Netflix announced that Anthony and Joe Russo would partner with Wizards to create an animated series based on the mythology of Magic the Gathering. The Russo brothers were executive producers on the series, with writers Henry Gilroy and Jose Molina as showrunners and Bardel Entertainment on animation. In July 2019, Joe Deaux reported in Bloomberg that "Magic is part of the [Hasbro's] 'franchise brands,' a segment that accounted for $2.45 billion in net revenue for the company last year." According to Chris Cocks, Magic accounted for a 'meaningful portion' of that, and KeyBanc estimated the game's contribution was more than $500 million of the franchise brands.

In open beta testing since September 2018, Wizards released a Hearthstone competitor in 2019 called Magic: The Gathering Arena which is a free-to-play digital collectible card game with microtransaction purchases. Brett Andress, an analyst at KeyBanc Capital Markets, predicted that Magic: The Gathering Arena would add at least a 20% boost to earnings.

2020–present 
During the Hasbro earnings call in February 2020, chief executive officer Brian D. Goldner reported that Wizards of the Coast was delivering positive results and that the company planned to double WotC's revenues between 2018 and 2023. He also reported that Magic: The Gathering'''s revenues increased over 30%, Magic: The Gathering Arena had a strong first year and Dungeons & Dragons revenues grew for the seventh straight year. Also in 2020, during the COVID-19 pandemic, virtual play for Dungeons & Dragons increased 86%.

On June 1, 2020, Wizards released a statement in support of their black fans, employees, and community members after the murder of George Floyd. This provoked a backlash as multiple open letters were published criticizing the company for their treatment of people of color and documenting many issues black and brown community members have taken with the company's actions. The New York Times, Polygon, and Kotaku reported that following this criticism Wizards banned seven Magic: The Gathering cards from tournament sanctioned play which were deemed racially offensive. The D&D team then announced that it would be making changes to portions of its 5th edition product line that fans had called out for being insensitive (including racist portrayals of a people known as the Vistani, an alleged in-fiction analog for the Romani people) and races characterized as monstrous and evil, such as orcs and drow. The company also announced plans to be make changes to character creation to broaden the permissible spectrum of character types and added a sensitivity disclaimer to some legacy products that feature cultures inspired by Asia, Mesoamerica, and the Middle East. The Washington Post reported that the tabletop community has widely approved these changes, although Wired criticized some of the change attempts as often feeling "like lip service".

During the 2021 Investor Event, Hasbro announced a company reorganization with three divisions: Consumer Products, Entertainment, and Wizards & Digital.  The announcement was paired with a rebrand including a new logo and refreshed website for Wizards of the Coast. Wizards opened a new development video game studio in 2021; the first project being a high-budget game based on the G.I. Joe franchise. In 2022, Chris Cocks became the CEO of Hasbro; Cynthia Williams replaced him as president of Wizards & Digital.  In June 2022, Hasbro defeated a board challenge from activist investor Alta Fox Capital Management LLC. The hedge fund company, which owns a 2.5% stake of Hasbro, had been pushing to spin out Wizards of the Coast "into its own company in an attempt to create what they saw was more value by making a second publicly traded company with a more profitable line of business". In July 2022, Wizards of the Coast announced that they were establishing a new video game studio called Skeleton Key which will focus on AAA games; Christian Dailey, formally of BioWare, will be head of the studio.

Hasbro also announced that Wizards would acquire the D&D Beyond digital toolset and game companion from Fandom. The official transfer to Wizards occurred in May 2022. At the Hasbro Investor Event in October 2022, it was announced that Dan Rawson, former COO of Microsoft Dynamics 365, was appointed to the newly created position of Senior Vice President for the Dungeons & Dragons brand; Rawson will act as the new head of the franchise. Dicebreaker highlighted that Rawson's role is "part of Wizards' plans to apply more resources to the digital side of D&D" following the purchase of D&D Beyond by Hasbro earlier in the year. Williams and Cocks, at a December 2022 investor-focused web seminar, called the Dungeons & Dragons brand "under monetized". They highlighted the high engagement of fans with the brand, however, the majority of spending is by Dungeon Masters who are only roughly 20% of the player base. Williams commented that the increased investment in digital will "unlock the type of recurrent spending you see in digital games".

In May 2022, The Gamer reported on the increased product release schedule for Magic: The Gathering, with "at least seven products in seven months". In October 2022, The Gamer commented that the increased number of preview seasons for the game was leading to exhaustion within the community and had "drained the well of enthusiasm dry". In November 2022, Wizards released a commemorative product, Magic: The Gathering 30th Anniversary Edition, for $999; this product rereleased 60 cards, however, none of these cards are sanctioned for tournament play. CNET stated that "it's not a practical purchase, it's a piece of art". Both WBUR and Vice reported that many fans were unhappy with the price point of the product. Vice commented that there is "a growing divide in the Magic: The Gathering community between the casual players and the collectors. [...] As Magic has grown in popularity and the number of out of print cards has grown, some rich collectors have turned the cards into a kind of commodities market [...]. Wizards of the Coast has increasingly catered to this kind of consumer" leading to products that are too expensive for many casual players. CNBC reported that "Bank of America downgraded the stock of Wizard of the Coast's owner, Hasbro" in November 2022 with analyst Jason Haas stating that changes to the Magic: The Gathering "brand amount to Hasbro 'killing its golden goose'" and highlighting that the "primary concern" is the overproduction of "Magic cards which has propped up Hasbro's recent results but is destroying the long-term value of the brand".

In January 2023, Wizards cancelled at least five unnamed video game projects; "the company also cancelled an internal project code-named Jabberwocky and two other external games that were early in development". Jason Schreier, Bloomberg News, highlighted that while fewer than 15 people are slated to lose their jobs at Wizards, "the reorganization will land hard for several independent studios such as Boston-based OtherSide Entertainment and Bellevue, Washington-based Hidden Path Entertainment, both of which were working on games for Wizards of the Coast".

Between November and December 2022, there was reported speculation that Wizards was planning on discontinuing the OGL for Dungeons & Dragons based on unconfirmed leaks. Following an initial response to the speculation by Wizards in November 2022, the company released limited details on the update to the OGL in December 2022; this included the addition of revenue reporting and required royalties. Linda Codega, for Io9, reported on January 5, 2023 the details from a leaked full copy of the OGL 1.1. Codega highlighted that "every single licensed publisher will be affected by the new agreement. [...] The main takeaway from the leaked OGL 1.1 draft document is that WotC is keeping power close at hand". ICv2 commented that the leaked OGL has several controversial parts including prohibiting "commercial publication for virtual tabletop platforms" and granting Wizards a license-back to use OGL "works in any way it sees fit without payment". In the days following the leak, IGN, Vice, The Guardian, Financial Times CNBC, and many other industry focused outlets reported on negative reactions from both fans and professional content creators. TheStreet highlighted that in the time it took Wizards to settle on a response "that could quell the ire of its audience, the company's main competitors banded together to fill a need in the industry that D&D was hoping to cement shut". Both Kobold Press and MCDM Productions announced upcoming new open tabletop RPG systems. Paizo also announced a new Open RPG Creative License (ORC), a system-agnostic license, as a direct response to the reported changes to the OGL. Additional publishers, such as Kobold Press, Chaosium, Green Ronin, Legendary Games, and Rogue Genius Games, will be part of the ORC development process.

A week after the leak, Wizards issued a response which walked back several changes to the OGL. The Motley Fool highlighted that "Hasbro pulled an abrupt volte-face" with the official statement on D&D Beyond framed as a "win-win for itself". The Motley Fool commented that this move was "an abject failure for Hasbro's business" if the assumed goal was to increase monetization of "Dungeons & Dragons properties, grow revenue for Hasbro, and earn more profits for Hasbro shareholders". TheStreet commented that Wizards united its "entire player base" against the plan; both TheStreet and Io9 highlighted the movement to boycott D&D Beyond and mass subscription cancellations with Io9 stating that the "immediate financial consequences" forced a response by Wizards. Io9 reported that Wizards' internal messaging on the response to the leak was this was a fan overreaction. Edwin Evans-Thirlwell, for The Washington Post, wrote that "pushback from fans, who criticized WotC’s response as far from an apology and a dismissal of their legitimate concerns, led WotC to backpedal further". Evans-Thirlwell highlighted the release of the proposed OGL 1.2 with an open comment period, however, "some say the damage is already done. [...] WotC appears to have committed an irreversible act of self-sabotage in trying to replace it — squandering the prestige accumulated over 20 years in a matter of weeks". On January 27, 2023, Wizards announced that following OGL1.2 feedback, they had decided to release the System Reference Document 5.1 (SRD 5.1) under an irrevocable creative commons license (CC-BY-4.0) effective immediately and would no longer pursue deauthorizing the OGL1.0a. Both Io9 and ComicBook.com called the major concessions by Wizards a "huge victory" for the Dungeons & Dragons community. In February 2023, Markets Insider reported that Bank of America continued to rate Hasbro's stock as underperforming and "said that the company faces a steep decline in its share price if it continues to 'destroy customer goodwill'" by over-monetizing brands within its Wizards segment; Bank of America highlighted that Wizards has over-monetized Magic: The Gathering and attempted to do the same with Dungeons & Dragons.

 Studios 
 Archetype Entertainment in Austin, Texas, U.S.; opened in April 2019.
Atomic Arcade in Raleigh, North Carolina, led by Ames Kirshen, formerly vice-president of production and creative at Warner Bros. Interactive Entertainment (WBIE), opened in September 2021.
D&D Beyond; founded in 2017, acquired in May 2022.
 Mirrorstone Books; opened in 2004.
 Studio X in Renton, Washington, U.S.; reorganization of Magic: The Gathering'' R&D in 2018.
 Skeleton Key in Austin, Texas; opened in July 2022.
 Tuque Games in Montreal, Quebec, Canada; founded in 2012, acquired in October 2019.
 Wizards Kids Studio in Seattle, Washington, U.S.; opened in December 2020.

Former 
 Avalon Hill in Renton, Washington, U.S.; founded 1952, acquired by Hasbro in 1998, moved to Wizards of the Coast in 2004, moved again to Hasbro Games in 2021.
 Last Unicorn Games in Philadelphia, Pennsylvania, U.S.; founded in 1994, acquired and dissolved in 2000.
 TSR, Inc. in Lake Geneva, Wisconsin, U.S.; founded in 1973, acquired and dissolved in 1997.

See also 
 List of Wizards of the Coast products

References

External links 

 

 
1990 establishments in Washington (state)
1999 mergers and acquisitions
American companies established in 1990
Companies based in Renton, Washington
Dungeons & Dragons
ENnies winners
Hasbro subsidiaries
Magazine publishing companies of the United States
Magic: The Gathering
Manufacturing companies based in Washington (state)
Manufacturing companies established in 1990
Pokémon Trading Card Game
Role-playing game publishing companies
Trading card companies